"John and Elvis Are Dead" is a 2005 song and single released by George Michael from his album Patience. It was co-written by childhood friend David Austin. It was released on 30 August 2005 as a download-only single and was therefore unable to chart in the United Kingdom under the chart rules at that time. The song marks George Michael's final single from a studio album

The song was also released on Michael's greatest hits album Twenty Five.

Music video 

Directed by Anthea Benton, the music video did not receive heavy airplay, although it remains popular among Michael's fans. It features, among many famous faces both alive and dead at the time of the release of the song, footage of those named in the title: John Lennon and Elvis Presley. In addition to John and Elvis, Marvin Gaye is also mentioned in the chorus of the song. Footage of Freddie Mercury used from Queen's music video "Bohemian Rhapsody" although he is not mentioned. Die Welt noted the religious tones of the song and video.

People shown in the video in order of appearance are:

Aretha Franklin
Stevie Wonder
Buzz Aldrin planting the first American flag on the Moon on July 21, 1969
Phil Daniels and Leslie Ash driving a Lambretta scooter on Goldhawk Road, Shepherd’s Bush in West London from the film Quadrophenia,  based on the rock opera of the same name by The Who
Elton John as the Pinball Wizard in the 1975 movie Tommy
David Johansen, vocalist of New York Dolls
Paul Weller, lead singer of the British band The Jam
Susan Janet Ballion, known professionally as Siouxsie Sioux, singer of the British band Siouxsie and the Banshees
Debbie Harry, lead singer of Blondie
Vivienne Westwood, British fashion designer
Kathleen Cleaver, activist of the American human rights movement Black Panthers Party
David Bowie performing "Ashes to Ashes".
Queen performing "Bohemian Rhapsody".
Phan Thi Kim Phuc and other children from the South Vietnamese village of Trang Bang running away from a napalm attack on 8 June 1972
John Lennon
Lady Diana on the day of her marriage with Prince Charles.
Nelson Mandela, elected first black president of South Africa after he had been convicted and jailed from  June 12, 1964, to February 11, 1990, for fighting for human rights.
Mother Teresa of Calcutta
John Lennon and Yoko Ono, being interviewed in their New York apartment.
Pope John Paul II
Marvin Gaye
Elvis Presley

Formats and track listings
Digital EP
 "John and Elvis Are Dead" – 4:23
 "Edith & the Kingpin" (Live at Abbey Road) – 3:46
 "Praying for Time" (Live at Abbey Road) – 4:57
 "For the Love (Of You)"
 "Precious Box" (Shapeshifters Remix)

References

2005 singles
2000s ballads
George Michael songs
Songs written by George Michael
Song recordings produced by George Michael
Soul ballads
Songs written by David Austin (singer)
2003 songs